Marco Antonio García Blanco (born 20 October 1960) is a Mexican diplomat and the current Ambassador of Mexico to Nigeria.

Education
Blanco received his bachelor's degree in International Relations from the National Autonomous University of Mexico and a master's degree in National Security from the National Defense College of Mexico.

Career
Upon completion of his studies, he was recruited by the Ministry of Foreign Affairs. He has served as advisor to the Secretary of Foreign Affairs. He has also been part of various delegations at international events.

See also
 Mexico–Nigeria relations

References

External links
 Embajada de México en Nigeria

1960 births
Living people
Ambassadors of Mexico to Nigeria
National Autonomous University of Mexico alumni